Kathryn N. Feldman is a justice of the Court of Appeal for Ontario, appointed to the bench in 1998. Previously, she was a justice of the Ontario Superior Court of Justice, appointed in 1990. She is a 1970 graduate of the University of Toronto and a 1973 graduate of the University of Toronto Faculty of Law. Before joining the judiciary, Feldman was a litigation partner at Blake, Cassels & Graydon.

References

Justices of the Court of Appeal for Ontario
University of Toronto Faculty of Law alumni
University of Toronto alumni
21st-century Canadian women
20th-century Canadian women
Canadian women judges